Danceteria was a nightclub that operated in New York City from 1979 until 1986 and in the Hamptons until 1995. The club operated in various locations over the years, a total of three in New York City and four in the Hamptons. The most famous location was likely the second, a four-floor venue at 30 West 21st Street in Manhattan that served as the location for the disco scene in the film Desperately Seeking Susan.

History
The first Danceteria was opened at 252 West 37th Street by German expatriate Rudolf Pieper and talent booker Jim Fouratt. It catered to a diverse after-hours crowd coming from the downtown rock clubs Mudd Club, Trax, Tier 3, Chinese Chance and CBGB, and gay discos. The club's DJs were Mark Kamins and Sean Cassette. An illegal, unlicensed facility, it was closed by the New York police and fire departments in 1980. The first Danceteria Video Lounge was designed by video artists John Sanborn and Kit Fitzgerald, who programmed an eclectic mix of found footage, video art, early music videos and musical performances. DJ Mark Kamins said the first Danceteria was the first club to play videos and have two separate DJs play for 12 straight hours. 

 
In 1982, John Argento hired Fouratt and Pieper to promote and book the talent which became the 21st Street Danceteria. The club operated out of the first three floors in an old industrial 12-story building. (Later the 4th floor was used as Congo Bill, and the abandoned 5th floor was once used as a performance space by Karen Finley.) The roof was also open in the warmer months with frequent barbeques.

The club opened to massive crowds and critical acclaim. The regular DJs on the main dance second floor were Mark Kamins on Saturday nights and Bill Bahlman on Thursdays and Fridays. Bill Bahlman was the in-house DJ at the uptown club Hurrah.  Bill brought his huge following with him to Danceteria.  The second floor DJ booth was custom-built for Bill's 6'2" height. Other DJ's on the second floor included Louis Martinez, who had cameos at places like Studio 54 and  Lolo, Richard Sweret, and Jody Kurilla. Bill Bahlman, Richard Sweret and Randa Relich Milliron ran the Experimental First Floor serving as both DJs and VJs during the club's first months of operation until Fouratt's ousting; former Mudd Club DJ Anita Sarko spun on the first floor, where the bands performed, as well as in the VIP room, Congo Bill, for special events. The Video Lounge was located on the third floor of the new space and Ben Salzman & Jessica Jason, continued the artistic quality of the Video Lounge. Danny Cornyetz made videos of some of the acts with the fixed ceiling camera that piped what was happening on the first-floor stage throughout the club.

Three months after opening, Argento and Pieper dismissed Fouratt and hired Ruth Polsky as the club's talent booker. Under Polsky's direction, the club became renowned as one of the centers of new wave music in New York and was frequented by many musicians and artists who became famous during the decade, such as Madonna, New Order, Duran Duran, Billy Idol, Sade, Wham!, R.E.M., the Smiths, Squeeze, Cyndi Lauper, Jean-Michel Basquiat, Keith Haring, Run-DMC, Depeche Mode, Butthole Surfers, The Fall, the B-52's, Samhain, Bauhaus, RuPaul, Berlin, the Units, Romeo Void, Sonic Youth, Swans, Stephen Merritt, Nick Cave and the Bad Seeds, the Cult, Karen Finley, Violent Femmes, Soft Cell, the Jesus and Mary Chain, Beastie Boys, LL Cool J and Rob Zombie.

Famed New York City doorman Haoui Montaug worked as a doorman at Danceteria.

In 1984, Argento and Pieper opened a successful Hamptons outpost of Danceteria in Water Mill, New York. This was the first trendy NYC-style nightclub to open in the Hamptons. Bill Bahlman DJ'ed the opening night of The Hamptons Danceteria.

The third Danceteria operated from 1990 to 1993 in a run-down midtown space, the Martha Washington Hotel at 30 East 30th Street. Kamins, Johnny Dynell, Walter V and Danceteria veteran Freddy Bastone were the DJs at this facility; NJ rock band Spare Change performed regularly on the main stage, usually inciting riots with their raw brand of rock music. Club Kid Goldy Loxxx DJed on the opening night in the lounge room, and for the first few Friday nights (along with Kamins) in the main room, one of the first times a club personality was chosen to spin.

In 2008, the 21st Street location was sold, to be converted to luxury condominiums. The plan was abandoned by the end of the year.

References

External links
 Video clip of Madonna's first public performance: "Everybody" at "No Entiendes" in Danceteria, with Howie Montaug's introduction.
 Video clip of Rolling Stones press party 1980

Nightclubs in Manhattan
1979 establishments in New York City
1995 disestablishments in New York (state)